The Executive Council of Upper Canada had a similar function to the Cabinet in England but was not responsible to the Legislative Assembly. Members of the Executive Council were not necessarily members of the Legislative Assembly but were usually members of the Legislative Council. Members were appointed, often for life. The first five members were appointed in July 1792. The Council was dissolved on 10 February 1841 when Upper Canada and Lower Canada were united into the Province of Canada. It was replaced by the Executive Council of the Province of Canada the same year.

After the War of 1812, the Executive Council was dominated by members of the Family Compact, an elite clique based in York.

List of Members of the Executive Council 

Notes:
 Æneas Shaw was an honorary member after 1803.
 The Reverend John Strachan was an honorary member until 25 July 1817.
 On 12 March 1836, all members of the council resigned to protest when the new Lieutenant Governor Sir Francis Bond Head refused to consult with his council.
 George Markland was an honorary member until 6 July 1827.

References 
Handbook of Upper Canadian Chronology, Frederick H. Armstrong, Toronto : Dundurn Press, 1985.

External links 
Ontario's Historical Plaques

Upper Canada
Parliaments of Upper Canada
Privy councils
Canadian ministers
Monarchy in Canada
1792 establishments in Upper Canada
1841 disestablishments in Upper Canada